The Guillermo Haro Observatory (Spanish: Observatorio Astrofísico Guillermo Haro - OAGH) is an astronomical observatory owned and operated by the National Institute of Astrophysics, Optics and Electronics (Spanish: Instituto Nacional de Astrofísica, Óptica y Electrónica - INAOE) in the Mexican state of Sonora. It is named after Professor Guillermo Haro.

Telescopes

The main telescope at the observatory is Ritchey-Chretein design with a  primary mirror and a  secondary mirror.  Four different instruments are available to be mounted at the Cassegrain focus.  Planning for the telescope began in 1972, but it was not dedicated until 1987.  Routine operations began in 1992.

The observatory has a  Schmidt-Cassegrain reflector built by Meade Instruments on an equatorial mount located in a separate dome.  It is used to make atmospheric extinction measurements and to monitor light pollution.

See also
 National Astronomical Observatory (Mexico)
 List of astronomical observatories

References

External links

Homepage of the Observatorio Astrofísico Guillermo Haro in Spanish
OAGH Clear Sky Clock Forecasts of observing conditions.

Astronomical observatories in Mexico
Cananea
Buildings and structures in Sonora